Angela Kordež (born May 22, 1926, date of death unknown) was a Yugoslavian cross-country skier during the 1950s. She finished 16th in the 10 km event at the 1952 Winter Olympics in Oslo.

External links
Yugoslavia's 1952 Winter Olympics results

1926 births
Year of death missing
Olympic cross-country skiers of Yugoslavia
Cross-country skiers at the 1952 Winter Olympics
Yugoslav female cross-country skiers